Brad Stromdahl (born April 12, 1977) is an American college baseball coach and former catcher. He is the head baseball coach at Georgia State University. Stromdahl played college baseball at Bethany Lutheran College from 1996 to 1997 before transferring to Southwest Minnesota State University where he played for coach Paul Blanchard in 1998 and 1999. He served as the head coach at Georgia Gwinnett College from 2012 to 2019.

Playing career
Stromdahl attended Justin-Siena High School in Napa, California before transferring to Lakeland Union High School in Minocqua, Wisconsin. Trout played for the school's varsity baseball, basketball and soccer. Stromdahl then enrolled at Bethany Lutheran College to play college baseball for the Bethany Lutheran Vikings team. After graduating with an associate's degree from Bethany Lutheran, Stromdahl transferred to Southwest Minnesota State University. As a senior in 1999, Stromdahl was named First Team All-Northern Sun Intercollegiate Conference.

Coaching career
On August 14, 2002, Stromdahl became an volunteer assistant at Marshall University. On August 18, 2003, Stromdahl was named an assistant at Central Michigan University. The following year, Stromdahl became an assistant at Georgia State University.

On October 18, 2011, Stromdahl was named the first head coach in the history of the Georgia Gwinnett College program.

On June 26, 2019, Stromdahl was named the head coach of the Georgia State Panthers baseball program.

Head coaching record

See also
 List of current NCAA Division I baseball coaches

References

External links
 Georgia State profile

Living people
1977 births
Baseball catchers
Bethany Lutheran Vikings baseball players
Southwest Minnesota State Mustangs baseball players
Marshall Thundering Herd baseball coaches
Central Michigan Chippewas baseball coaches
Georgia State Panthers baseball coaches
Georgia Gwinnett Grizzlies baseball coaches
People from Napa, California
People from Napa County, California
People from Minocqua, Wisconsin